Forest is a city and the county seat of Scott County, Mississippi, United States. The population was 5,684 at the 2010 census and the population is a minority-majority.

Geography

Demographics

2020 census

As of the 2020 United States Census, there were 5,430 people, 1,987 households, and 1,165 families residing in the city.

2000 census
As of the census of 2000, there were 5,987 people, 2,085 households, and 1,478 families residing in the city. The population density was 460.0 people per square mile (177.7/km2). There were 2,257 housing units at an average density of 173.4 per square mile (67.0/km2). The racial makeup of the city was 40.35% White, 50.88% African American, 0.40% Native American, 0.53% Asian, 0.07% Pacific Islander, 5.85% from other races, and 1.92% from two or more races. Hispanic or Latino of any race were 12.71% of the population.

There were 2,085 households, out of which 36.5% had children under the age of 18 living with them, 41.6% were married couples living together, 24.1% had a female householder with no husband present, and 29.1% were non-families. 23.7% of all households were made up of individuals, and 10.6% had someone living alone who was 65 years of age or older. The average household size was 2.80 and the average family size was 3.25.

In the city, the population was spread out, with 29.3% under the age of 18, 10.6% from 18 to 24, 27.5% from 25 to 44, 19.7% from 45 to 64, and 13.0% who were 65 years of age or older. The median age was 32 years. For every 100 females, there were 94.8 males. For every 100 females age 18 and over, there were 91.5 males.

The median income for a household in the city was $25,638, and the median income for a family was $29,767. Males had a median income of $23,825 versus $17,277 for females. The per capita income for the city was $16,484. About 21.6% of families and 23.5% of the population were below the poverty line, including 29.5% of those under age 18 and 13.8% of those age 65 or over.

Economy

Forest is home to several poultry processing plants, including Koch Foods, Tyson Foods, and the Forest Packing Company.

Raytheon has a consolidated manufacturing center in Forest; it builds electronic equipment for radars and other sensor systems.

Education
Almost all of the City of Forest is served by the Forest Municipal School District. Schools include Forest Elementary School, Hawkins Middle School and Forest High School.

A small portion is in the Scott County School District.

Infrastructure

Transportation 
Forest is served by Interstate 20, U.S. Route 80, and Mississippi Highways 21, 35, and 501. Air transportation is available through G. V. Montgomery Airport or the nearby Jackson-Evers International Airport (JAN).

Notable people
 Rashard Anderson, football player
 "Big Boy" Crudup (1905-1974), blues musician - wrote "That's All Right (Mama)", honored with a Mississippi Blues Trail marker.
 James Eastland (1904–1986), United States Senator from Mississippi
 Sheila Guyse (1925-2013), actress and recording artist
 Andrew R. Johnson (1856–1933), Louisiana state senator from 1916–1924.
 Lewis Nordan, writer
 Todd Pinkston, former NFL wide receiver, Philadelphia Eagles
 The Scott Sisters, convicted in a controversial case that has drawn national attention
 Kevin Sessums, writer
 Donald Triplett, first person to be diagnosed with autism
 Victoria Vivians, athlete, played at Mississippi State University for the women's basketball program. Drafted by Indiana Fever of the WNBA.
 Cardis Cardell Willis, comedian

References

External links
 City of Forest, Mississippi website

Cities in Mississippi
Cities in Scott County, Mississippi
County seats in Mississippi
Mississippi Blues Trail